Ezoza Bakhtiyor qizi Sharipova (born 11 June 1996) is an Uzbekistani footballer who plays as a midfielder for Women's Championship club Sogdiana and the Uzbekistan women's national team.

International career
Sharipova capped for Uzbekistan at senior level during the 2021 Turkish Women's Cup.

References 

1996 births
Living people
People from Qashqadaryo Region
Uzbekistani women's footballers
Women's association football midfielders
Uzbekistan women's international footballers
21st-century Uzbekistani women